This list of rivers and streams in Ostwestfalen-Lippe contains a selection of the rivers, streams and lakes which lie wholly or partly in Ostwestfalen-Lippe (OWL). The rivers are organised based on the Weser, Lippe and Ems river systems. In addition they are sometimes further divided into sub-regions. The list does not contain all named rivers in OWL, but at least all those with a total catchment area of 10 square kilometres. The list of lakes is also not a full list of all named lakes, especially as the distinction with ponds is not always clear.

System

River or stream 
System: River name (No., L/R, district) 
No: River number
L/R: Left or right tributary
District: districts passed (only OWL districts)
BI: Bielefeld
GT: Kreis Gütersloh
HF: Kreis Herford
HX: Kreis Höxter
LIP: Kreis Lippe 
MI: Kreis Minden-Lübbecke
PB Kreis Paderborn

All tributaries are listed in downstream order in relation to their parent river. The tributaries are listed based on their ranking in the river system:
1st order (river discharges into the sea)
2nd order (river discharges into a river, which discharges into the sea)
3rd order (river discharges into a river, which  discharges into a river, which discharges into the sea)
4th order: analogous to the above

Lakes 
System: Name (Parish, district, surface area, origin/type)
District: see above
Water surface area: in hectares
Origin/Type: reservoir, gravel pit, Altwassersee, natural origin, etc.

The lakes are in order of size. If the lake is the largest in its district, the district name is in bold.

Lippe → Rhine

Upper Lippe to its confluence with the Pader 
Rhine (not in OWL)
Lippe (2781, R, PB)
Schlänger Bach (27812, R, PB)	
Steinbeke (27814, L, PB)	
Beke (27816, L, PB)	
Durbeke (278162, R, PB)

Pader → Lippe 
Rhine (not in OWL)
Lippe (2781, R, PB)
Pader (27818, L, PB)	
Rothebach (278182, R, PB)	
Springbach (2781822, L, PB)

Alme → Lippe 
Rhine (not in OWL)
Lippe (2781, R, PB)
Alme  (2782, L, PB)	
Nette (27822, R, PB)	
Lühlingsbach (278222, L, PB)
Harlebach (278232, L, PB)	
Afte (27824, R, PB)	
Karpke (278242, L, PB)	
Aa (278244, R, PB)
Kleine Aa
Talgosse (27826, L, PB)	
Altenau (27828, R, PB)	
Piepenbach (278282, L, PB)	
Sauer (278284, R, PB)	
Bach von Kleinenberg (2782842, R, PB)	
Odenheimer Bach (2782844, R, PB)	
Schmittwasser (2782846, R, PB)
Ellerbach (278286, R, PB)
Salenkruke (Rotenbach) (2782862, R, PB)
Finkenpuhl (2782864, L, PB)

Lippe between the Alme and the Glenne 
Rhine (not in OWL)
Lippe (2781, R, PB)
Thune (27832, R, PB)
Grimke (278324, R, PB)
Roter Bach (278332, R, PB)
Franzosenbach (2783322, R, PB)	
Gunne-Elsen (278334, R, PB)	
Gunne (27836, L, PB)	
Erlbach (278362, RL, PB)	
Heder (278372, R, PB)	
Wellebach (2783722, L, PB)	
Merschgraben (278392, R, PB)

Glenne → Lippe 
Rhine (not in OWL)
Lippe (2781, R, PB)
Glenne (Haustenbach) (2784, L, PB)
Knochenbach (278412, R, PB)	
Krollbach (278414, R, PB)
Schwarzer Graben (27842, R, PB)
Kaltestrot (278454, R, PB)	
Ochsengraben (Mentzelsfelder Kanal) (27848, L, PB)

Ems → North Sea

Upper Ems to its confluence with the Dalke 
Ems (3, -, PB, GT) 
Schwarzwasserbach (31112, L, PB)
Holtebach (311122, R, PB)
Hallerbach (3111222, R, PB)		
Furlbach (3112, R, LIP, PB, GT)
Bärenbach (31122, L, GT)		
Sennebach (3114, R, LIP, GT)	
Grubebach (3116, L, GT)	
Schwalenbach  (Forthbach) (31164, L, GT)	
Rothenbach (311712 dort Rothebach)
Merschgraben (3117122)
Eusternbach (31172, L, GT)	
Hamelbach (3118, L, GT)

Dalke → Ems 
Ems (3, -, PB, GT) 
Dalke (312, R, BI, GT)	
Sprungbach (3122, L, BI)
Strothbach (31232, L, BI, GT)		
Hasselbach (3124, R, BI, GT)	
Menkebach (3126, L, LIP, BI, GT)	
Wapelbach (3128, L, LIP, GT)	
Rodenbach (31282, R, GT)
Großer Bastergraben (312836, R, GT)		
Ölbach (31284, R, LIP, GT)
Westerholter Bach (312842, R, LIP, GT)
Schnakenbach (3128422, R, LIP, GT)	
Landerbach (312844, R, LIP, GT)
Krampsbach (3128442, R, LIP, GT)
Knisterbach (312892, R, GT)

Ems between the Dalke and the Lutter 
Ems (3, -, PB, GT) 
Ruthenbach (31312, L, GT)	
Poggenbach (31314, L, GT)

Lutter → Ems 
Ems (3, -, PB, GT) 
Lutter (3132, R, BI, GT)	
Trüggelbach (31322, L, BI, GT)	
Reiherbach (31324, L, BI, GT)
Krullsbach (313258, R, BI, GT)		
Welplagebach (Reinkebach, Schlangenbach) (31326, L, GT)	
Lichtebach (31328, R, BI, GT)

Ems between the Lutter and the Hessel 
Ems (3, -, PB, GT) 
Abrooksbach (Landbach) (3134, R, GT)	
Hovebach (31342, R, GT)	
Reckbach (31344, L, GT)	
Rhedaer Bach (3136, R, GT)
Kleinebach (313612, L, GT)
Künsebecker Bach (31362, L, GT)
Ellerbrockgraben (313692, L, GT)	
Wippe (313698, L, GT)
Loddenbach (3138, R, BI, GT)	
Ruthebach (31382, L, GT)	
Axtbach (314, L, GT)	
Maibach (3144, L, GT)
Beilbach (3146, L, (not in OWL))	
Flutbach (31472, R, GT)	
Südlicher Emstalgraben (Südlicher Graben) (31492, R, GT)	
Jungferngraben (Nördlicher Talgraben) (3152, R, GT)

Hessel → Ems 
Ems (3, -, PB, GT) 
Hessel (316, R, GT)	
Casumer Bach (31612, R, GT)
Berghauser Bach (3161212, R, GT)
Pustmühlenbach (316122, L, GT)
Bruchbach (3162, R, GT)
Rolfbach (31622, L, GT)
Oberwiesengraben (31626, L, GT)
Halstenbecker Bach (31624, L, GT)
Alte Hessel (31632, L, GT)	
Aabach (3164, R, GT)

Weser → North Sea

Diemel → Weser  
Weser (4, -, HX, LIP, HF, MI)
Diemel (44, RL, GT)	
Hammerbach (4436, L, HX)	
Schwarzbach (44362, R, HX)	
Mühlengraben (4438, RL, HX)	
Naure (44382, L, HX)
Ohme (44384, L, HX)
Twiste (444, R, HX)	
Eggel (4454, L, HX)
Mühlenbach (44542, L, HX)
Eder (44544, R, HX)
Vombach (44592, L, HX)
Alster (4472, L, HX)

Upper Weser between the Diemel and the Nethe 
Weser (4, -, HX, LIP, HF, MI)
Bever (4512, L, HX)
Eselsbach (45122, R, HX)

Nethe → Weser 
Weser (4, -, HX, LIP, HF, MI)
Nethe (452, L, HX)
Helmerte (45216, R, HX)
Taufnethe (4522, R, HX)
Öse (4524, L, HX)
Aa (4526, L; PB, HX)
Hilgenbach (45262, L, HX)
Katzbach (45264, L, HX)
Brucht (4528, R, HX)
Emderbach (45282, R, HX)
Grundbach (452822, L, HX)
Hakesbach (45286, L, HX)
Silberbach (45294, R, HX)

Upper Weser between the Nethe and the Emmer 
Weser (4, -, HX, LIP, HF, MI)
Grube (4534, L, HX)
Fischbach (45344, R, HX)
Schelpe (45352, L, HX)
Saumer (45354, L, HX)
Twierbach (45372, L, HX)
Lonaubach (45392, L, HX, LIP)
Spiekersiek (453924, L, LIP)

Emmer → Weser 
Weser (4, -, HX, LIP, HF, MI)
Emmer (456, L, HX, LIP)
Fischbach (Emmer) (45612, L, HX)
Mühlenbach (45614, R, HX)
Beberbach (4562, R, HX)
Röthe (45624, L, LIP)
Heubach (4564, R, LIP, HX)
Silberbach (45642, L, LIP)
Napte (45652, L, LIP)	
Diestelbach (4566, L, LIP)
Königsbach (45662, R, LIP)
Istruper Bach (456624, L, LIP)
Niese (4568, R, HX, LIP)	
Kleinenbredener Bach (45684, L, HX)	
Wörmke (45694, R, LIP)
Ilsenbach (456942, L, HX, LIP)
Eschenbach (45696, L, LIP)

Upper Weser between the Emmer and the Werre 
Weser (4, -, HX, LIP, HF, MI)
Humme (4574, L, LIP)
Grießbach (457421, R, LIP)
Beberbach (45744, L, LIP)
Exter (458, L, LIP)
Alme (4584, L, LIP)
Twiesbach (4592, R, MI )
Herrengraben (4594, L, LIP)
Kalle (4596, L, LIP)
Westerkalle (Kallbach) (45962, L, LIP)
Forellenbach (4598, L, HF)
Linnenbeeke (45982, R, HF)
Borstenbach (45992, L, HF)

Werre → Weser

Upper Werre to its confluence with the Bega 
Weser (4, -, HX, LIP, HF, MI)
Werre (46, L, LIP, HF, MI)
Steinbach (-,R, LIP)
Strangbach (-, L, LIP)
Wedasch (-, R, LIP)
Wörbke (46114, R, LIP)
Diestelbach (-, R, LIP)
Wiembecke (4612, L, LIP)
Berlebecke (Wiggenbach, Knochenbach) (46124, L, LIP)
Rethlager Bach (4616, L, LIP)
Rothenbach (46172, L, LIP)
Haferbach (4618, L, LIP)
Krebsbach (461816, L, LIP)
Gruttbach (46182, R, LIP)
Bentgraben (46192, L, LIP)
Heipker Bach (46194, L, LIP)
Siekbach (46196 L, LIP)
Bexter (46198, L, LIP)

Bega → Werre 
Weser (4, -, HX, LIP, HF, MI)
Werre (46, L, LIP, HF, MI)
Bega (462, R, LIP)
Hillbach (46214, R, LIP)
Passade (4622, L,LIP)
Marpe (46224, R, LIP)
Linnebach (46232, L, LIP)
Ilse (4624, R, LIP)
Niederluher Bach (46242, L, LIP)
Ötternbach (4626, L, LIP)
Rhienbach (46272, R, LIP)
Sudbach (462725, R, LIP)
Salze (4628, R, HF, LIP)
Glimke (46282, L, HF, LIP)

Aa → Werre 
Weser (4, -, HX, LIP, HF, MI)
Werre (46, L, LIP, HF, MI)
Aa (Johannisbach) (464, R, BI, HF)
Schwarzbach (4642, L, GT, BI)
Mühlenbach (464216, R, GT, BI)
Hasbach (464218, R, GT, BI)
Beckendorfer Mühlenbach (46422, L, HF, BI)
Schloßhofbach (46432, R, BI)
Sudbrackbach (464322, R, BI)
Jöllenbecker Mühlenbach (46452, L, BI, HF)
Lutterbach (Lutter) (4646, R, BI)
Baderbach (464612, R, BI) 
Windwehe (46462, R, BI, LIP)
Oldentruper Bach (464628, R, BI)
Eickumer Mühlenbach (Kinsbeke) (4648, L, BI, HF)

Werre between the Aa and the Else 
Weser (4, -, HX, LIP, HF, MI)
Werre (46, L, LIP, HF, MI)
Düsedieksbach (4652, L, HF)
Lippinghauser Bach (46524, L, HF)
Bramschebach (4654, R, HF)

Else → Werre 
Weser (4, -, HX, LIP, HF, MI)
Werre (46, L, LIP, HF, MI)
Else (466, 3, R, HF) 
Laerbach (not in OWL)
Steinbach (466212, R, GT)
Violenbach (4664, R, GT)
Kilverbach (46654, L, HF)
Warmenau (4666, R, HF, GT)
Spenger Mühlenbach (46664, R, HF, GT)
Darmühlenbach (46672, L, HF)
Neue Else (46674, R, HF)
Werfener Bach (466742, R, HF)
Gewinghauser Bach (46676, L, HF)
Brandbach (Bolldambach) (4668, R, HF)
Ostbach (46679X, L, MI, HF)

Lower Werre after its confluence with the Else 
Weser (4, -, HX, LIP, HF, MI)
Werre (46, L, LIP, HF, MI)
Rehmerloh-Mennighüffer Mühlenbach (468, L, HF, MI)
Tengerner Bach (4684, L, MI)
Schnathorster Bach (46842, R, MI)
Mühlenbach (46884, R, MI)
Mittelbach (4694, R, HF, MI)
Kaarbach (Wulferdingser Bach) (46992, L, MI)

Middle Weser between the Werre and Große Aue 
Weser (4, -, HX, LIP, HF, MI)
Meierbach (471312, L, MI)
Dehmer Mühlenbach (47132, L, MI)
Bastau (4714, L, MI)
Flöthe (47142, L, MI)
Ronceva (L,MI)
Bastau-Entlaster (47148, L, MI)
Osterbach (47192, R, MI)
(Bückeburger) Aue (472, R, MI)
Sandfurthbach (4726, L, MI)
Ösper (4732, L, MI)
Rottbach (Weser) (4734, L, MI)
Gehle (474, R, MI)
Ils  (4744, R, MI)
Riehe (4746, L, MI)

Große Aue → Weser 
Weser (4, -, HX, LIP, HF, MI)
Große Aue (476, L, MI)
Mehner Bach (47612, R, MI)
Flöthe (47614, R, MI)
Kleine Aue (47618, R, MI)	
Braune Aue (476182, R, MI)	
Großer Dieckfluss (4762, L, MI)	
Hollwedener Graben (476216, L, MI)	
Twiehauser Bach (476218, R, MI)
Fehrnwiesen Graben (47622, L, MI)
Kleiner Dieckfluss (47624, R, MI)	
Tielger Bruchgraben (47626, L, MI)	
Wickriede (4764, R, MI)	
Flöthe (47644,	R, MI)
Langenhorster Graben (476454, L, MI)	
Kleine Wickriede (47646, R, MI)

Weser, north of the Große Aue 
Weser (4, -, HX, LIP, HF, MI)
Steinhuder Meerbach (R, not in OWL)	 
 Fulde (4782, L, MI)
Steertschlaggraben (47832, L MI)

Hunte → Weser 
Weser (4, -, HX, LIP, HF, MI)
Hunte (R, not in OWL)
Wimmerbach (4961129, R, MI) (not in OWL)
Heithöfer Bach (4961124, LR, MI)
Schröttinghauser Bach (4961124, R, MI)
Grenz Canal (496114, R, MI)
Ompteda Canal (496261, L, not in OWL)
Brockumer Pissing (496262, L, MI)

Remark: In the catchment area of the Hunte the streams listed are often just drainage ditches or canals, that cannot be of thecribed using the usual hierarchy of a classic river system with main rivers and tributaries, because there is no constant direction of flow. As a result it is only ansatzweise angedeutet, how the waterbody is linked to its main river.

Shipping canals 
Mittelland Canal with Minden Aqueduct and access to the Weser

Lakes 
Aabachsee (Bad Wünnenberg, PB, 180 ha, Stausee) (teilweise in OWL)
Lippesee (Paderborn, PB, 103 ha, Stau- and Baggersee)
Alter See-Mittlerer See-Neuer See (Großer Weserbogen) (Porta Westfalica, MI, 90 ha, Baggersee / Altwassersee)
Schiedersee (Emmerstausee) (Schieder-Schwalenberg, LIP, 82 ha, Stausee)
Rietberger Fischteiche (Teichanlage bestehend aus 27 verbundenen Teichen, Rietberg,  GT, 49,9 ha, Fischteiche/ Gräfte)
Hochwasserrückhaltebecken Keddinghausen (Büren, PB, 47,5 ha, Stausee)
Heddinghauser See (Paderborn, PB, 36 ha)
Nesthauser See (Paderborn, PB, 30 ha, Baggersee)
Mastholter See (Benteler See) (Rietberg, GT, 26 ha, Baggersee)
Stemmer See (Kalletal, LIP, 25 ha, Altwassersee)
Rathsee (Paderborn, PB, 25 ha)
Bentfelder See (Paderborn, PB, 24 ha)
Obersee (Johannisbachtalsperre) (Bielefeld, BI, 20 ha, Stausee)
Mühlensee (Paderborn, PB, 15 ha)
Altensenner See (Paderborn, PB, 13 ha)
Axelsee (Beverungen, HX, 12 ha, Altwassersee)
Lintler See (Gütersloh, GT, 12 ha)
Hücker Moor (Spenge, HF, 11 ha)
Emssee (Rietberg, GT, 11 ha)
Norderteich (Horn- Bad Meinberg, LIP, 11 ha)
Meschesee (Detmold, LIP, 9 ha)
Padersee (Paderborn, PB, 7,8 ha)
Großer Auesee (Espelkamp, MI, 4,5 ha)
Oberlübber Bergsee (Hille, MI, 0,8 ha, ehemaliger Steinbruch)

External links 
Gewässer in OWL,Website der Hochschule Ostwestfalen-Lippe mit Übersichtskarte
Fließgewässerinformationssystem
Bilanz der Uferstreifen (pdf file; 14 kB)

!